Oriens, the Latin word for "the East", may refer to:

 the Praetorian prefecture of Oriens or of the East
 the Diocese of Oriens, part of the prefecture
 Oriens Christianus, an academic journal
 Oriens (butterfly), a genus of butterflies in the family Hesperiidae
 The Morning Star
 Oriens (demon)